Cheryl Rainfield (born August 19, 1972) is a Canadian author. She is an incest and ritual abuse survivor. She battled with abuse by reading numerous books, and by writing and creating art during her early life which opened doors for her as an escape. She is an active feminist and a lesbian. Her favourite pastime is reading. She is a passionate reader, and enjoys writing and creating art. She lives with her dog, Petal, and her cat, Amazon. She currently resides in Toronto, Ontario.

Volunteer work and education
Rainfield was born in Toronto, Ontario, Canada. She has been involved with the Regular Children's/YA Critique Group for more than 11 years. She volunteers at CANSCAIP (Canadian Society of Children's Authors, Illustrators, and Performers). She completed an editing course at George Brown College in 1999 that covered proofreading, copy editing, and substantive editing.

Notable works
Rainfield is most famous for her book called Scars. She wrote the first draft in a few short months, and then for over ten years she edited and revised the book more than forty times before it was accepted for publication by WestSide Books. She based the book Scars on some of her personal life experiences. Cheryl Rainfield has many similarities with the protagonist of the story Kendra. Rainfield wrote the book in order to speak out about self-harm, sexual abuse, and being a queer teen, and to help others who've been through those experiences to know that they are not alone, and to encourage greater compassion and  understanding in people who don't have those experiences. For the launching of the book, she partnered with the Toronto Rape Crisis Centre because she used this centre as a help line when she was a teen. Cheryl donates a portion of all her earnings from Scars to RAINN (Rape, Abuse, and Incest National Network) and the TRCC (Toronto Rape Crisis Centre). The actual cover of the book is a picture of Rainfield's forearms which shows that she has been through much of Kendra's pain.

Novels and short stories

The Healer
It is a compilation of 14 different horror stories. Like most anthologies it contains a variety of stories. The Horrors: Terrifying Tales: Book Two is no different. The stories ranges from the proverbial babysitter gone mad to the necrophilia fairy tale with a twist. The one thread that weaves itself through this collection of stories is teenage angst. Each story deals with an aspect of teen life, and the worst nightmares contained in that demographic come true. The Horrors is a teenager's worst nightmares given breath.

Comfort Food
It is a collection of twenty three writers and seven artists. The vibrant vivid cover represents the contents inside the pages. The common denominator is anything fast food related, and the ensemble runs the gamut from zombie delicacies to child hungry playgrounds. No food was safe, burgers, seafood, even the healthy conscious vegetarian cuisine has a darker ickier side.

The Last Dragon (Dragon Speaker, 1)
Manning, the evil Lord rules through fear and magic over the fallen kingdom in the year 1144. The only hope seems to lie in the prophecy that a dragon speaker will appear to save the people. Jacob, a small young man is an unlikely hero. He walks with a limp and is the only one that can speak to the dragons. When the last dragon returns  he is the only one that can communicate with her. Jacob and his friends Orson and Lia must rescue the egg of the world's last dragon. This is a hi-lo (high interest, low vocabulary) book for reluctant teen readers.

Scars
Scars is a fiction book about Kendra, a lesbian  teen who was sexually abused but doesn't remember who abused her. As her abuser starts leaving her threatening messages, Kendra uses self-harm, as well as art and therapy, to cope. Kendra is aware that she copes with her emotional pain through self-harm and tries to seek help through a therapist. Scars is a compelling story of the teen survivor, Kendra and her journey to becoming a person she wants to be.

SkinWalkers (Walking Both Sides)
Claire and her cousin Kelsey are hunting and Kelsey ends up shooting a deer Skinwalker. They soon find themselves captured by Skinwalkers seeking revenge. When angry villagers attack the Skinwalker camp, Claire finds herself in a difficult situation. Who will she choose and whose side is she really on? This is a hi-lo (high interest, low vocabulary) book for reluctant teen readers.

Hunted
Hunted is a paranormal fantasy/dystopian book about Caitlyn, a teen telepath in a world where Paranormal powers are illegal. Caitlyn is on the run from government troopers. Whet Caitlyn falls for Alex, a Normal, and discovers dangerous renegade Paranormals, Caitlyn must decide between staying in hiding to protect herself, or taking a stand to save the world. It is a journey in which Caitlin must make decisions in order to do what is right. Cheryl drew on her abuse experiences (and specifically ritual abuse and torture) to write Hunted, just as she did with Scars.

Influences
Cheryl Rainfield is one of the many authors of this day and age that has influenced darker subject matter in novels for the life of teens. With correlation to her writing; she has inspired many to speak out against abuse and feelings of teen angst. Rainfield has also been reviewed in many blogs, newspapers, and magazines such as the Torontoist. In many articles she is portrayed as a notable writer in the subjects of inner strength and about self acceptance. The nature of her books are about love and being a strong individual in the most extreme emotional conditions. Throughout her career, she has also made many public appearances like Daytime Toronto (TV) and as well as numerous radio interviews. On her website Cheryl Rainfield states, "I write about some of the harsh things teens go through ... things that shouldn't be hidden…". The ideas from her books come from experiences she has faced as a teenager and ones that many young adults may have confronted in their lives.

Awards

Bibliography

Novels
The Last Dragon: Dragon Speaker, 1 (2009)
Scars (March 2010)
SkinWalkers: Walking Both Sides (2011)
Hunted (Dec 2011)
Stained (Oct 1, 2013)

Short stories
The Healer (2006)
Comfort Food (2007)

References

External links

Topics.myfoxboston.com

1972 births
Living people
Canadian bloggers
Canadian feminist writers
21st-century Canadian novelists
Canadian philanthropists
Canadian women novelists
Canadian lesbian writers
Queer feminists
Writers from Toronto
Canadian writers of young adult literature
Canadian LGBT novelists
Canadian women bloggers
21st-century Canadian women writers
Women writers of young adult literature
21st-century Canadian LGBT people
Lesbian novelists